Rafael Nadal was the defending champion but lost in the semifinals to Andy Murray.

Andrey Rublev won the title, defeating Murray in the final.

Seeds

Draw

Draw

Play-offs

References

External links
Official website

2021 in Emirati tennis
World Tennis Championship
Mubadala World Tennis Championship - Men
2021 tennis exhibitions